Main Street Historic District is a national historic district located at Cold Spring Harbor in Suffolk County, New York.  The district has 32 contributing buildings.   The majority of the buildings were built between 1855 and 1890. It encompasses the village's historic core and charts its development from a major whaling port to a summer resort community.

It was added to the National Register of Historic Places in 1985.

References

External links
Main Street Historic District Map (Living Places)

Historic districts on the National Register of Historic Places in New York (state)
Federal architecture in New York (state)
Georgian architecture in New York (state)
Historic districts in Suffolk County, New York
National Register of Historic Places in Suffolk County, New York
National Register of Historic Places in Huntington (town), New York